NBA Showdown is a 1993 video game for the Super Nintendo Entertainment System game console. The game is a sequel to Bulls vs. Blazers video game. The same title was re-released for the Mega Drive/Genesis as NBA Showdown 94. It is the fifth and final game in the NBA Playoffs series of games, before the series was re-branded as NBA Live.

Play mode
The game could be played in various ways: players could play against each other, or against the computer. Games against the computer were divided into two levels, "exhibition" or "playoffs". Players could pick from any of the NBA teams for the first time, including non-playoff teams. Games could be configured for 2, 5, 8, or 12 minute quarters.

History

 It was one of the first basketball games (at least in terms of technically EA Sports series of NBA Live games) to feature every NBA team in the league. Tecmo NBA Basketball, which was released in 1992, was the first game to do so.
 It was the first basketball game to feature in-game 3rd party advertisements for companies like Starter and Topps stadium.
 It was the first game to deviate from the traditional Eastern Conference finals team vs Western Conference finals team naming convention. Sequentially this title should have been called Bulls versus Suns following the 1993 Finals. There were controversies as to whether star players like Charles Barkley opting out of the players licensing had a profound effect on EA changing to a more generic name like NBA Showdown.
 It was the first basketball game in which EA Sports, the entity, within EA officially took over the game.
It was the last basketball game produced at EA's San Mateo studio before production moved to Vancouver for the NBA Live series.
 It was the first EA Sports game to have the tenths of a second rule in the last minute.
 The Super NES version was the last NBA game to feature Michael Jordan before the release of NBA Live 2000 years after.

Notes

References

External links
 

1993 video games
Electronic Arts games
National Basketball Association video games
Sega Genesis games
Super Nintendo Entertainment System games
Video games set in 1993
Video games set in 1994
Multiplayer and single-player video games
Video games developed in the United States